Miroslav Maratovich Nemirov (8 November 1961 – 21 February 2016) was a Russian poet, associated with Russian punk rock, born in Rostov-on-Don. He is most known as a founder of Instruktsiya po Vyzhivaniyu rock group in 1985 in Tyumen and the author of the Great Tyumen Encyclopaedia, as well as being a regular columnist of Russian Journal between 2000 and 2003. He collaborated with Grazhdanskaya Oborona as well. 

Nemirov was born in Rostov-on-Don in 1961 and moved to Tyumen in the beginning of the 1980s, where he studied languages at the Tyumen State University. He was one of the founders of the Tyumen rock club. 
In the 1990s he returned to Rostov-on-Don where he became one of the founders of the art group Art or Death. One of the members of the group was Avdey Ter-Oganyan, who left for Prague in 1989, and Nemirov wrote a book about the art of Ter-Oganyan. Later he moved to Moscow. In 1999 he organized the Association of Masters of Arts OsumBez (Osumasshedshevshiye Bezumtsy). The partnership consisted of poets, photographers and musicians. Among other members of the group there were Vsevolod Yemelin, Vladimir Bogomyakov, and German Lukomnikov.

Nemirov died of cancer in Moscow in 2016.

Much of the lyrics of Nemirov contain obscene words and expressions and could not be published or put online according to Russian laws. The compendium of Nemirov's essays in Russian Journal is considered as an encyclopedia of Russian rock music. Most of his poems and essays remain unpublished.

References

Russian male poets
1961 births
2016 deaths
Writers from Rostov-on-Don